Statistics of the USFSA Football Championship in the 1910 season.

Tournament

First round
Cercle des Sports Stade Lorrain 1-1 Racing Club de Reims (match replayed)
Cercle des Sports Stade Lorrain 2-1 Racing Club de Reims 
Amiens SC 5-0 FC Rouen
US Le Mans  4-1 Union sportive de Tours
FC Rouen 6-1 Amiens SC

1/8 Finals 
US Tourcoing 5-0 Football club de Braux
Stade Bordelais UC 3-1 Stade nantais université club
Olympique de Cette 3-1 Stade toulousain
SH Marseille 11-0 AS Cannes
Lyon Olympique 4-1 Racing Club Franc-Comtois de Besançon
Stade français 3-0 SM Caen
Union sportive Servannaise 7-1 US Le Mans
Amiens SC 8-1 Cercle des Sports Stade Lorrain

Quarterfinals  
Stade Bordelais UC 3-1 Olympique de Cette
Union sportive Servannaise 2-0 Stade français
US Tourcoing 5-0 Amiens SC
SH Marseille 5-0 Lyon Olympique

Semifinals  
US Tourcoing 3-0 Union sportive Servannaise
SH Marseille 4-1 Stade Bordelais UC

Final  
US Tourcoing 7-2 SH Marseille

References
RSSF

USFSA Football Championship
1
France